In organic chemistry, a tricarbonate is a compound containing the divalent [–O–(C=O)–O–(C=O)–O–(C=O)–O–] functional group, which consists of three carbonate groups in tandem, sharing two oxygen atoms.  These compounds can be viewed as double esters of a hypothetical tricarbonic acid, HO–(C=O)–O–(C=O)–O–(C=O)–OH.  An important example is di-tert-butyl tricarbonate (H3C–)3C–C3O7–C(–CH3)3, a chemical reagent (colorless prisms that melt at 62–63 °C with decomposition, soluble in pentane).

The term "tricarbonate" is sometimes used for salts that contain three carbonate anions in their stoichiometric formula, such as cerium tricarbonate Ce2(CO3)3.

See also
Dicarbonate

References

Esters